Działosza may refer to the following places in Poland:
Działosza in Gmina Syców, Oleśnica County in Lower Silesian Voivodeship (SW Poland)
Other places called Działosza (listed in Polish Wikipedia)
See also:
Działosza coat of arms